The Millennial Bee (also known in English as The Bee Millennium), is a 1983 film made and produced in Czechoslovakia, West Germany and Austria. The film is based on a novel written by Peter Jaroš and was directed by Juraj Jakubisko. The film was selected as the Czechoslovakia entry for the Best Foreign Language Film at the 57th Academy Awards, but was not accepted as a nominee.

Cast
 Jozef Kroner as Martin Pichanda
 Stefan Kvietik as Samo
 Michal Docolomanský as Valent
 Jana Janovská as Ruzena
 Eva Jakoubková as Kristína
 Ivana Valesová as Mária
 Pavol Mikulík as Julo
 Igor Cillík as Svanda
 Jirí Císler as Belányi

Film awards 
  XL. Venice Film Festival 1984  • Golden Phoenix for The best art direction and cinematography  • Catholic Prize
  FEST Belgrade 1984  • UNICEF Prize
  IV. IFF Sevilla 1984  • Grand Prize 
  Czechoslovak Journalists’ Prize
  XXII. Film Festival Banská Bystrica 1984  • Grand Prize

See also
 List of submissions to the 57th Academy Awards for Best Foreign Language Film
 List of Czechoslovak submissions for the Academy Award for Best Foreign Language Film

References

External links
 
 Tisícročná včela at Slovak Film Database

1983 films
Slovak-language films
Films directed by Juraj Jakubisko
Films scored by Petr Hapka
1980s war films
Golden Kingfisher winners
Czechoslovak war films
Slovak war films
Slovak epic films